Yōko Sugi (杉 葉子) (October 28, 1928 – May 15, 2019) was a Japanese actress who performed major roles in films like Aoi sanmyaku and Repast.

Early life 
Sugi was born on October 28, 1928 in what is now Bunkyo, Tokyo, Japan. In 1945 she graduated from a Japanese high school in Shanghai.

Career 
After returning to Japan in 1947, Sugi entered the second Toho New Face competition. She joined Toho after winning the competition. She soon gained popularity as a calm and refined actress. Her first film was Aoi sanmyaku, which released in 1949. Sugi performed in several other coming of age films, and became known for them.

In 1962, Sugi married an American, retired from the entertainment industry, and moved to the United States. She worked at the New Otani Hotel in Los Angeles. Occasionally returning to Japan, she appeared in films like The Twilight Years. She served as a Japanese Cultural Envoy to the United States for the Agency for Cultural Affairs in 2005.

Sugi moved back to Japan in 2017. She died on May 15, 2019 of colon cancer in Tokyo.

Filmography 

Aoi sanmyaku (1949)
Repast (1951)
Tokyo Sweetheart (1952)Husband and Wife (1953)The Sound of the Mountain (1954)Onna no Koyomi (1954)The Eternal Breasts (1955)The Moon Has Risen (1955)A Wife's Heart (1956)A Rainbow Plays in my Heart (1957)The Twilight Years (1973)Picture Bride'' (1994)

References

External links 
 

2019 deaths
1928 births
People from Tokyo
Japanese actresses